The 2001 HEW Cyclassics was the sixth edition of the HEW Cyclassics cycle race and was held on 19 August 2001. The race started and finished in Hamburg. The race was won by Erik Zabel.

General classification

References

2001
2001 in German sport
Hew Cyclassics
2001 in road cycling
August 2001 sports events in Europe